Michael Edward Hazlewood (24 December 1941 – 6 May 2001) was a British singer-songwriter and composer. He variously worked with Albert Hammond, T-Bone Burnett, Van Dyke Parks and Harry Nilsson.

Biography
Educated at Hazelwick School, in Crawley, West Sussex, Hazlewood began his career as a DJ at the radio station Radio Luxembourg in the early 1960s. In 1966, he founded the group the Family Dogg with Albert Hammond and Steve Rowland. In addition, he often wrote songs in collaboration with Hammond such as "Green Green Trees" or "Little Arrows" for Leapy Lee, and "Gimme Dat Ding" for the Pipkins. He wrote "The Air That I Breathe" for Phil Everly's 1973 solo album Star Spangled Springer. The song was subsequently a huge hit for the Hollies.

Hazlewood's collaboration with Hammond resulted in co-written songs for the latter such as "It Never Rains in Southern California" and "The Free Electric Band".

Hazlewood and Hammond also wrote the international hit song "Make Me an Island" for the Irish singer Joe Dolan in 1969, as well as his follow-up singles, "Teresa" and "You're Such a Good Looking Woman". The latter became a signature hit for Dolan, topping the Irish charts twice, in 1970 and 1997 when he re-recorded it with Dustin the Turkey. Hazlewood also wrote the song "Southern Lady", which was recorded by Rita Coolidge.

During the late 1980s, Hazlewood held the theatrical rights to Mervyn Peake's novel Mr. Pye, and completed a musical theatre version of the book in collaboration with Howard Lee Sloan, the American-born pianist and composer.

Hazlewood and Hammond are also credited as co-writers of the 1992 Radiohead song, "Creep".  Due to similarities to "The Air That I Breathe", Radiohead was successfully sued for plagiarism. "Creep" used a chord progression taken from "The Air That I Breathe" in its verse, and a melody from the latter in the bridge following the second chorus.

On 6 May 2001, Hazlewood died aged 59 from a heart attack, during his holiday in Florence, Italy.

References

1941 births
2001 deaths
Deaths in Tuscany
People educated at Hazelwick School
English male singers
English songwriters
People from Cuckfield
20th-century English singers
20th-century British male singers
British male songwriters
British soft rock musicians